Gymnosporangium clavipes is a plant pathogen, a fungus that causes cedar-quince rust. Similar to Gymnosporangium juniperi-virginianae and  Gymnosporangium globosum, the fungus infects a wide range of Rosaceae, such as apple, hawthorn and quince trees, and also requires an evergreen host such as eastern red cedar or a number of other juniper species to complete its life cycle.

References

External links

Pucciniales
Apple tree diseases
Fruit tree diseases
Fungal tree pathogens and diseases
Galls
Fungi described in 1873